To tha X-Treme is the third solo album from rapper Devin the Dude. The album peaked at #55 on the Billboard 200. It features a high-profile guest appearance from 8Ball.

Track listing

Samples
"Right Now" - Contains a sample of "Shower the People" by James Taylor
"Go Fight Some Other Crime" - Contains a sample of "Rhymes Too Funky Pt. 1" by Compton's Most Wanted
"Anythang" - Contains a sample of "Hollywood" by Rick James
"Party" - Contains a sample of "I'm Ready" by Kano

Charts

References

2004 albums
Devin the Dude albums
Rap-A-Lot Records albums